Sulfathiourea is a sulfonamide antibacterial.

References 

Sulfonamide antibiotics
Thioureas